Bad of the Heart is the name of the debut studio album by the Latin freestyle singer George Lamond. It was released on July 16, 1990, by CBS Records/Columbia Records.  The album's title track scored Lamond his biggest hit single to date, when the tune reached #25 on the U.S. pop charts in early 1990.

Track listing

Personnel 

 Tony Aliprantis – engineer
 Philip Andreula – All arrangements, Music, keyboards and production for the track "Without You"   
 Chris Barbosa – producer, engineer, mixing
 George "Spin Twin" Barcia – assistant engineer
 John Bastianelli – arranger, saxophone
 Quinn Batson – assistant engineer
 Dave Carlock – arranger, backing vocals
 Debbie Cole – backing vocals
 Tom Coyne – mastering
 Maurice Crutcher – keyboards
 Bill Cunliff – keyboards
 Tony Fielding – backing vocals
 Mark Hubbard – assistant engineer
 David Jurman – executive producer
 Ted Karas – guitar
 George Lamond – vocals, backing vocals
 Jerry Lane – guitar, engineer, mixing
 Brad LeBeau – executive producer
 Mark Liggett – producer, engineer, mixing
 Mike Lorello – keyboards, engineer
 Tom Mandel – keyboards
 Anthony Papamichael – engineer
 Joey Norosavage – keyboards
 Frank Ockenfels – photography
 Leroy Quintyn – assistant engineer
 Evan Rodgers – backing vocals
 C.P. Roth – keyboards
 Steve Schmidt – keyboards
 Tony Sellari – art direction
 Matthew "Ammo" Senatore – rap
 Michael Sharfe – bass
 Danielle Spagnolo – backing vocals
 Brenda K. Starr – vocals
 Kevin Thomas – assistant engineer
 Tommy Uzzo – engineer, mixing
 Frank Vilardi – percussion
 Randy Villars – saxophone
 Matt Yelton – keyboards, backing vocals

Charts 
Album - Billboard (United States)

Singles - Billboard (United States)

References 

1990 debut albums
George Lamond albums
CBS Records albums
Columbia Records albums